Lessons of a Dream is a German drama film directed by Sebastian Grobler, loosely based on the life of German football pioneer Konrad Koch in the late 19th-century. In the film, Koch is one of the first English teachers in the German Empire, in Braunschweig. He introduces his students to the new sport of football, completely unknown outside of England at the time, to get them interested in English culture and the English language. Koch's liberal teaching methods upset his conservative colleagues, the student's parents, and local dignitaries.

Historical background

The real-life Konrad Koch was a teacher of German, Ancient Greek, and Latin in Braunschweig. He wrote the first German version of the rules of football and organized the arguably first ever match of football in Germany in 1874, between pupils of his school, the Martino-Katharineum. However, unlike in the film, Koch's original German version of the rules of football, published in 1875, still closely resembled those of rugby football. In addition, Koch was actually a conservative himself and did not get into trouble with the authorities.

External links

References

2011 films
2010s German-language films
Films shot in Braunschweig
German association football films
Films set in the 1870s
Sports films based on actual events
2010s sports drama films
2011 drama films
2010s German films